In number theory, the integer complexity of an integer is the smallest number of ones that can be used to represent it using ones and any number of additions, multiplications, and parentheses. It is always within a constant factor of the logarithm of the given integer.

Example
For instance, the number 11 may be represented using eight ones:
11 = (1 + 1 + 1) × (1 + 1 + 1) + 1 + 1.
However, it has no representation using seven or fewer ones. Therefore, its complexity is eight.

The complexities of the numbers 1, 2, 3, ... are
1, 2, 3, 4, 5, 5, 6, 6, 6, 7, 8, 7, 8, 8, 8, 8, 9, 8, ... 

The smallest numbers with complexity 1, 2, 3, ... are
1, 2, 3, 4, 5, 7, 10, 11, 17, 22, 23, 41, 47, ...

Upper and lower bounds
They asked for the largest number with a given complexity ; later, Selfridge showed that this number is

Its expression is
(1 + 1) × (1 + 1) × (1 + 1 + 1) × (1 + 1 + 1).
Thus, the complexity of an integer  is at least . Almost all integers have a representation whose length is bounded by a logarithm with a smaller constant factor, .

Algorithms and counterexamples
The complexities of all integers up to some threshold  can be calculated in total time .

Algorithms for computing the integer complexity have been used to disprove several conjectures about the complexity.
The smallest example of a number whose optimal expression is not of this form is 353942783. In fact, one can show that . Moreover, Venecia Wang gave some interesting examples, i.e.

References

External links

Integer sequences